Yixian may refer to :

 Places and jurisdictions
 Yi County, Anhui, in China
 Yi County, Hebei, in China
 Yi County, Liaoning, in China
 the Latin Catholic Apostolic Prefecture of Yixian, near Beijing and Baoding
 Yi County, Shandong, now Yicheng District, Zaozhuang
 Yixian Formation, a geological formation in Liaoning Province

Persons
Empress Yixian, Liang Nüying (died 159), Chinese empress during the Han Dynasty